Jeffrey Todd Coleman is an American computer game designer and businessman. He is known for Shadowbane, released in 2003, and Wizard101, released in 2008.
 He was a founder at Wolfpack Studios, which was purchased by Ubisoft. He also worked at the KingsIsle Entertainment in Austin, Texas. On February 1, 2013, Coleman resigned from KingsIsle Entertainment to pursue other interests. He is currently Creative Director of the Kickstarter-backed MMORPG Crowfall.

Biography
J. Todd Coleman was raised in Westlake, Texas. Coleman became involved in the virtual world industry in 1985, when he was selected to be a Game Master on a dial-up adventure game known as Scepter of Goth.  In college, he and his friends (Josef Hall, James Nance, and Patrick Blanton) were pioneers in text mudding. Together, they created and ran ChaosMUD, a DikuMUD derivative. Coleman's first commercial endeavor was a database tools and technology company called Reliant Data Systems, which was sold in 1999 to Compuware Corporation.

Coleman, along with Josef Hall, James Nance, Patrick Blanton and Robert Marsa, created a virtual world company called Wolfpack Studios, and created the game Shadowbane.  Wolfpack was sold in early 2003 to Ubisoft, which assumed control of the Shadowbane game service and ran it until July 1, 2009. Coleman currently serves as the Vice President and Creative Director, and is the co-creator (with Hall) of Wizard101, a massively multiplayer online role-playing game for KingsIsle Entertainment. Coleman's in-depth knowledge of the online video game business, with additional expertise in sales, marketing and business development make him an outstanding and valued member of the KingsIsle Entertainment team. Coleman is not currently working with KingsIsle Entertainment, however. In addition, Coleman has a long history of entrepreneurial endeavors, with product innovation and strategic planning as his strengths.

In May 2009, he was named the 6th most influential person in online gaming by Beckett Massive Gamer Magazine, a Beckett Media publication.

In November 2009, he was named one of the Top 50 most influential game developers by Game Developer Magazine.

In May 2010, he was named the 15th most influential person in online gaming by Beckett Massive Gamer Magazine, a Beckett Media publication.

In March 2011, he was named the #1 Most Influential person In the Massively Multiplayer Online game industry by Beckett Massive Gamer Magazine, a Beckett Media publication.

On April 25, 2012, Coleman announced KingsIsle Entertainment's new release, Pirate101, a game made corresponding to Wizard101.

On January 25, 2013, Coleman announced that he would be leaving KingsIsle Entertainment. On February 1, 2013, Coleman resigned from KingsIsle Entertainment.

In January 2015, Coleman announced Crowfall, an MMORPG, with ArtCraft Entertainment Inc. Its Kickstarter campaign raised $1,766,204 from 16,936 backers. The game released on July 6, 2021.

References

External links
 Shadowbane official site
 Wizard101 official site
 interview with MMOsite
 interview with Ten Ton Hamster
 Pirate101 Official site

American businesspeople
American video game designers
MUD developers
Living people
Year of birth missing (living people)